The Oratory of San Biagio is Romanesque-style, Roman Catholic parish chapel or church located in the frazione of Roncoscaglia in the Apennine hills above the town of Sestola in the province of Modena, region of Emilia-Romagna, Italy.

History
This oratory was erected in the 13th century and still retains sculpted images on the portal. Some of the carved images depict demons, hence a nickname of chiesa del diavolo. It is only open for certain festival days.

References

15th-century Roman Catholic church buildings in Italy
Churches in the province of Modena
Romanesque architecture in Emilia-Romagna